William Patrick Gleason (September 6, 1894 – January 9, 1957) was a Major League Baseball second baseman who played with the Pittsburgh Pirates in  and  and the St. Louis Browns in .

External links

1894 births
1957 deaths
Major League Baseball second basemen
Pittsburgh Pirates players
St. Louis Browns players
Minor league baseball managers
Meriden Hopes players
Reading Pretzels players
Springfield Ponies players
Lynn Pirates players
Lynn Pipers players
Chattanooga Lookouts players
Columbus Senators players
Memphis Chickasaws players
New Haven Profs players
Albany Senators players
Allentown Buffaloes players
New Haven Bulldogs players
Richmond Byrds players
Baseball players from Chicago